In enzymology, a beta-glucogallin O-galloyltransferase is an enzyme that catalyzes the chemical reaction

2 1-O-galloyl-beta-D-glucose  D-glucose + 1-O,6-O-digalloyl-beta-D-glucose

Hence, this enzyme has one substrate, 1-O-galloyl-beta-D-glucose, and two products, D-glucose and 1-O,6-O-digalloyl-beta-D-glucose.

This enzyme belongs to the family of transferases, specifically those acyltransferases transferring groups other than aminoacyl groups.  The systematic name of this enzyme class is 1-O-galloyl-beta-D-glucose:1-O-galloyl-beta-D-glucose O-galloyltransferase.

References

 
 

EC 2.3.1
Enzymes of unknown structure